The Worcestershire Women's cricket team is the women's representative cricket team for the English historic county of Worcestershire. They play their home games at various grounds across the county, including Chester Road, Kidderminster and Stourbridge Road, Himley. They are captained by Chloe Hill. In 2019, they played in Division Two of the final season of the Women's County Championship, and have since competed in the Women's Twenty20 Cup. They are partnered with the West Midlands regional side Central Sparks.

History
Worcestershire Women played their first recorded match in 1949, against Cheshire, which they won by 75 runs. They joined the Women's County Championship in 2004, as part of the County Challenge Cup, and placed 2nd in their group in their first season. 

Worcestershire gained promotion from Division Three in 2009, topping the league with 7 wins from 10 games. They were relegated a season later, but immediately regained their place in Division 2, being promoted in 2011. Worcestershire have since retained their position in Division 2, apart from a brief stint in Division 3E in 2018.

They also joined the Women's Twenty20 Cup in 2009 for its inaugural season. When the competition was regionalised, Worcestershire gained promotion to Division Midlands & North 1 in 2011, beating Northamptonshire in the Division Final by 45 runs.  Since the tournament's national structure was implemented, Worcestershire have been as low as Division 3 and as high as Division 1. Their promotion to Division 1 in 2017 was a high-point, with Worcestershire bowler Clare Boycott ending the season as the leading wicket-taker in the division. In 2021, they competed in the West Midlands Group of the Twenty20 Cup, finishing 3rd in the group with 2 victories. They won their group in the 2022 Women's Twenty20 Cup, topping the initial group stage before emerging victorious on the group Finals Day. Worcestershire batter Georgina Macey was the second-highest run-scorer across the whole competition, with 295 runs. They also competed in the West Midlands Regional Cup in 2022, winning the initial group stage but losing in the final to Wales.

Players

Current squad
Based on appearances in the 2022 season.

Notable players
Players who have played for Worcestershire and played internationally are listed below, in order of first international appearance (given in brackets):

 Zehmarad Afzal (2000)
 Miranda Veringmeier (2008)
 Sian Ruck (2009)
 Heather Siegers (2018)
 Sarah Glenn (2019)
 Issy Wong (2022)

Seasons

Women's County Championship

Women's Twenty20 Cup

Honours
 Women's Twenty20 Cup:
 Group winners (1) – 2022

See also
 Worcestershire County Cricket Club
 Central Sparks

References

Cricket in Worcestershire
Women's cricket teams in England